James Dockery (born November 9, 1988) is a former  American football cornerback. He played for the Cleveland Browns and Carolina Panthers. He played college football for Oregon State University.  He currently is the head coach at Xavier College Preparatory High School (California) in Palm Desert, California.

References

External links 
Cleveland Browns bio
Oregon State Beavers bio

1988 births
Living people
American football cornerbacks
Carolina Panthers players
Cleveland Browns players
Oakland Raiders players
Oregon State Beavers football players
People from Palm Desert, California
Players of American football from California
Sportspeople from West Covina, California
Sportspeople from Riverside County, California